Elkaduwa  ( sinhala:ඇල්කඩුව, Tamil:எல்கடுவ ) is a village in Sri Lanka. It is located within Matale District, Central Province.There are two roads to reach Elkaduwa. One is from Ukuwela (Matale), the other one is from Wattegama (Kandy).

Local Government Council
Elkaduwa is governed by the Ukuwela Pradeshiya Sabha.

tourist attractions 
Sembuwatta
Hunnas Falls

See also
List of towns in Central Province, Sri Lanka

External links

Populated places in Matale District